Yuezhou (越州镇) is a town in Qilin District, Qujing, Yunnan, China. 

Township-level divisions of Qujing